The Weber number (We) is a dimensionless number in fluid mechanics that is often useful in analysing fluid flows where there is an interface between two different fluids, especially for multiphase flows with strongly curved surfaces. It is named after Moritz Weber (1871–1951). It can be thought of as a measure of the relative importance of the fluid's inertia compared to its surface tension. The quantity is useful in analyzing thin film flows and the formation of droplets and bubbles.

Mathematical expression
The Weber number may be written as:
  

where
  is the drag coefficient of the body cross-section.
  is the density of the fluid (kg/m3).
  is its velocity (m/s).
  is its characteristic length, typically the droplet diameter (m).
  is the surface tension (N/m).

The modified Weber number,

  

equals the ratio of the kinetic energy on impact to the surface energy,

,

where

  

and

.

Applications
One application of the Weber number is the study of heat pipes. When the momentum flux in the vapor core of the heat pipe is high, there is a possibility that the shear stress exerted on the liquid in the wick can be large enough to entrain droplets into the vapor flow. The Weber number is the dimensionless parameter that determines the onset of this phenomenon called the entrainment limit (Weber number greater than or equal to 1). In this case the Weber number is defined as the ratio of the momentum in the vapor layer divided by the surface tension force restraining the liquid, where the characteristic length is the surface pore size.

References

Further reading
Weast, R. Lide, D. Astle, M. Beyer, W. (1989-1990). CRC Handbook of Chemistry and Physics. 70th ed. Boca Raton, Florida: CRC Press, Inc.. F-373,376.

Dimensionless numbers
Fluid dynamics
Dimensionless numbers of fluid mechanics